Demons of the Night is the first EP and second single from New Zealand metal band, Demoniac. It was limited to 500 copies worldwide and was only pressed to 7" vinyl from French Label Osmose Productions.

It contained two tracks from the 1999 full-length album The Fire and the Wind on side 1 and on side 2 it contained two non album tracks

Track listing

Side 1
 Night Demons – 0:57
 Demons of the Night – 5:06

Side 2
 Red Light II (1999 Goatlord Version) – 4:35
 Kill All the Faggots (Death Squad Anthem) – 5:11

Personnel
 Behemoth – vocals, bass
 Heimdall – guitar
 Shred – guitar
 Matej – drums

References

External links
 Official website (offline)

Demoniac albums
1999 EPs
Osmose Productions EPs